Zafar Mehmood Mughal is a Pakistani Lawyer, He was elected as Chairman Executive of Punjab Bar Council for the year 2011-12. He has been Member Punjab Bar Council for  the term 2010-14.
both Zafar Mehmood Mughal and Muhammad Lehrasib Khan Gondal were elected unopposed as Punjab Bar Council’s chairman executive and vice chairman, respectively in 2011-12 Elections. He has set the record of being elected as member of Punjab bar council for the second time as in the history of Pakistan no one has ever won for the second time. After Chairman Executive, he was selected as Deputy Attorney General of Pakistan. Recently he also elected as the President of high court. Zafar Mehmood Mughal became the president of the Lahore High Court Bar Association, Rawalpindi bench. He secured 965 votes while Ghulam Mustafa Kandwal took 571, Sarkar Abbas 471 and Ghufran Khurshid Imtiazi sixteen votes.

Zafar Mehmood Mughal has 3 children. His elder son Adeel Zafar has completed his education in United Kingdom and he is an active human rights activist.

References
 
https://www.dawn.com/news/739012

External links
 All India Bar Association members met Rehman Malik

Chairmen of the Punjab Bar Council
Advocates
Pakistani lawyers
Living people
Year of birth missing (living people)
People from Lahore